Philotheca conduplicata is a species of flowering plant in the family Rutaceae and is endemic to eastern Australia. It is a shrub with elliptical leaves clustered near the ends of the branchlets and white flowers arranged singly or in two or threes on the ends of the branchlets.

Description
The ten stamens are moderately hairy.

Taxonomy and naming
This species was first formally described in 1970 by Paul G. Wilson who gave it the name Eriostemon myoporoides subsp. conduplicatus and published the description in the journal Nuytsia, from specimens collected by Joseph Maiden and Ernst Betche near Howell (north of Bundarra in 1905. In 2005 Paul Irwin Forster raised the subspecies to species status as Philotheca conduplicata in the journal Austrobaileya.

Distribution and habitat
Philotheca conduplicata grows among granite boulders in the Granite Belt in northern New South Wales and south-eastern Queensland.

References

conduplicata
Flora of New South Wales
Flora of Queensland
Sapindales of Australia
Plants described in 1970
Taxa named by Paul G. Wilson